Żebbuġ Rangers Football Club is a football club from the town of Żebbuġ in Malta. The club currently competes in the Maltese Premier League.

Players

Current squad

External links

Official website
Official website

 
Football clubs in Malta
1943 establishments in Malta
Association football clubs established in 1943